Raymond L. Daniels, Jr. (September 27, 1933 – July 5, 2017) was an American film editor.

Daniels is best known for his work on The Streets of San Francisco, Starsky & Hutch, Hawaii Five-O, and Hill Street Blues. He had an extended collaboration (1981–1985) with showrunner Steven Bochco and edited the pilots for Hill Street Blues and L.A. Law. Daniels was nominated for seven Emmy Awards.

Personal life 

Raymond L. Daniels, Jr. was born on September 27, 1933 in New London, Connecticut, USA. In 1942, the family moved to Los Angeles. He attended Hollywood High School and married Claudia LaVarre, daughter of actor John Merton and sister of Lane Bradford. Daniels died on July 5, 2017 in West Hills, California, USA.

Awards and nominations

Primetime Emmy Awards

American Cinema Editors Awards

References

External links
 

1933 births

2017 deaths
Hollywood High School alumni
American film editors
American television editors
People from New London, Connecticut
Emmy Award winners